The 1948–49 BAA season was the Steamrollers' third and final season in the NBA/BAA. The team would fold after finishing last in the league for a second consecutive season, at 12–48.

Draft

Roster

Regular season

Season standings

Record vs. opponents

Game log

Awards and records
Ken Sailors, All-NBA Second Team

References

Providence Steamrollers seasons
Providence